Cameron Walker may refer to:

 Cameron Walker (soccer), Canadian soccer player 
 Cameron Walker (Canadian football) (born 1992), Canadian football defensive lineman
 Cameron Walker-Wright, American singer-songwriter